Kachi (also Romanized as Kachī and Kechī) is a village in Barzavand Rural District, in the Central District of Ardestan County, Isfahan Province, Iran. At the 2006 census, its population was 32, in 14 families.

References 

Populated places in Ardestan County